Harpalus gravis is a species of ground beetle in the subfamily Harpalinae. It was described by John Lawrence LeConte in 1858.

References

gravis
Beetles described in 1858